The 2016 FIA World Rally Championship-3 was the fourth season of the World Rally Championship-3, an auto racing championship recognized by the Fédération Internationale de l'Automobile, ran in support of the World Rally Championship. It was created when the Group R class of rally car was introduced in 2013. The Championship was composed of fourteen rallies, and drivers and teams had to nominate a maximum of six events. The best five results counted towards the championship.

Quentin Gilbert was the defending champion, as he won the 2015 title.

Calendar

Teams and drivers

Results and standings

Season Summary

FIA World Rally Championship-3 for Drivers

Points are awarded to the top ten classified finishers.

FIA World Rally Championship-3 for Co-Drivers

Notes
  – Points earned with Michel Fabre
  – Points earned with Frédéric Hauswald

FIA World Rally Championship-3 for Teams

References

External links
Official website of the World Rally Championship
Official website of the Fédération Internationale de l'Automobile

 
World Rally Championship 3